Ba-Muaka Simakala (born 28 January 1997) is a German professional footballer who plays as a forward for 3. Liga side VfL Osnabrück.

Personal life
Born in Germany, Simakala is of Congolese descent.

References

External links
 

Living people
1997 births
People from Eschweiler
Sportspeople from Cologne (region)
German footballers
German expatriate footballers
Germany youth international footballers
German sportspeople of Democratic Republic of the Congo descent
Association football forwards
Alemannia Aachen players
Borussia Mönchengladbach players
Roda JC Kerkrade players
SV Elversberg players
SV Rödinghausen players
VfL Osnabrück players
Bundesliga players
3. Liga players
Regionalliga players
Eerste Divisie players
Footballers from North Rhine-Westphalia
German expatriate sportspeople in the Netherlands
Expatriate footballers in the Netherlands